Lorenzo Antonio (born Lorenzo Antonio Sánchez Pohl October 3, 1969, in Albuquerque, New Mexico, United States), is an American Latin music singer-songwriter, who is known and recognized in Mexico, the United States, and Latin America. He was raised in both Mexico and in the United States, and is fluent in both Spanish and English. Most of his songs are in Spanish, but he has released songs in English as well.

Biography

Early life
Having come from a musical family, Lorenzo Antonio was exposed to music as soon as he was born. By the age of 5, Antonio's interest in music was very apparent, and his father taught him how to sing "La Bamba", while accompanying himself on the guitar. He learned this very quickly, and Lorenzo's parents decided to place him in private classical guitar lessons, which he studied from his childhood through his teen years.

Throughout his childhood, Antonio briefly studied the fiddle, banjo, and piano, as well as the cello, which he played throughout elementary school, middle school, and high school. During these early years, Lorenzo also displayed great vocal and performing abilities and on occasion, his father, Amador Sánchez, also known as the very successful singer / songwriter / producer, Tiny Morrie, would present Lorenzo onstage at his performances.

Career

Lorenzo Antonio's career began in June 1982 when at age 12, he and his four sisters (Verónica, Rosamaria, Kristyna, and Carolina) won 1st place in one of the most important talent festivals in all of Latin America, "1er Festival Juguemos A Cantar", which was held in Mexico City and transmitted by Televisa on the immensely popular television show, "Siempre en domingo". They appeared in the competition as "Lorenzo Antonio y Su Grupo" (Lorenzo Antonio and His Group), and performed Antonio's composition, "Vamos a Jugar".

For winning this competition, Antonio was awarded 3 appearances on "Siempre En Domingo", as well as a record contract with Discos Musart. This exposure launched Antonio's career, and by the end of 1982, he had become one of the most successful and famous Latin artists of that time, recognized immensely for playing the fiddle, the uniforms that he and his sisters wore (sailor caps and bellbottom pants), as well as for the choreography that he and his four sisters performed to his song, "Vamos a Jugar", which was a song about a dance move very similar to the hokey pokey “ , "la mano izquierda va adelante y la derecha para atras" (the left hand goes to the front and the right hand goes to the back).

As Antonio entered his teen years, he separated from his sisters and continued his career as a soloist. At that time, this was a controversial change due to the group's popularity, and many of their fans did not like this. Ultimately, the change proved to be a great success for Antonio and his sisters. Antonio's popularity continued to grow, and he became one of the most successful and popular singer / songwriters of the 1980s and 1990s. His 4 sisters continued for a few years as the children's group, "Chikis", and some years later, became the internationally successful and famous girl group, Sparx.

Throughout the 1980s and 1990s, Antonio toured Mexico, Central America, South America, and the United States extensively. Most of his international hits came during this time period. Among the most popular are, "Vamos A Jugar", "Muchachita", "Como Me Gustas", "Busco Un Amor", "Dile", "No Llorare", "Buscare" (peaked at #7 on Billboard's Top Latin Song chart, May 14, 1988), "El No Te Quiere" (peaked at #9 on Billboard's Top Latin Song chart, April 12, 1997), "No Quieren Que Te Quiera" (peaked at #16 on Billboard's Top Latin Song chart, August 16, 1997), and "Como Cuando Y Porque" (peaked at #12 on Billboard's Top Latin Song chart, July 16, 1994), which was an original song written and given to him by Mexican singer / songwriter, Juan Gabriel. In 1987, Antonio scored what is considered to be his greatest hit, and one of the most successful Latin ballads of the 1980s, the now classic ballad, "Doce Rosas." On May 23, 1987, Doce Rosas reached #3 on Billboard Magazine's Top Latin Songs chart.

In the early 1990s and after a 2-year college stint at the University of New Mexico, Lorenzo Antonio signed with a new record company, Warner Music Group. At this time, he also met Juan Gabriel and had a successful comeback with the albums, Mi Tributo A Juan Gabriel and Tributo 2.

In the mid 1990s, Antonio focused his attention on his sisters, Sparx. They were starting to gain notoriety in the Latin market in the United States, and Antonio spent his time writing songs for them.

In the late 1990s, Antonio signed a record deal with Fonovisa Records. The albums that Antonio released at this time were geared more to the Regional Mexican market, and Antonio's record sales were among the highest of his career.

Songwriter
Not only has Lorenzo Antonio written many of his hit records, ("Vamos A Jugar", "Como Me Gustas", "Lagrimas De Juventud", "Busco Un Amor", "No Quieren Que Te Quiera", and others), but also hits for other artists as well. Some of the most outstanding are: "El Baile De La Gallina" performed by Tatiana, "Te Amo Te Amo Te Amo", "Los Hijos De Pantaleon", "El De Los Ojos Negros" and ""Si Ya No Hay Amor" performed by his sisters, Sparx.

Other styles
While Lorenzo Antonio is most known internationally for interpreting romantic ballads, he has also been very successful interpreting New Mexico music and Mariachi music. 

Lorenzo Antonio has also released several albums in the Ranchera genre that feature his guitar playing. One of the songs featured on his Ranchera albums, "Ranchera Jam" featured a mashup of him performing New Mexico style version of Mexican staples like "Cielito Lindo" and Tito Guízar's "Allá en el Rancho Grande" and Country music classics Johnny Cash's "Folsom Prison Blues" and Hank Williams' "Jambalaya (On the Bayou)".

He participated with his sisters, Sparx, on the certified platinum albums, "Cantan Corridos" (peaked at #5 on Billboard's Top Regional Mexican Albums chart on February 8, 1997), and "Cantan Corridos Vol. 2," which are two of the most successful albums of his career.

Duets and other collaborations
In 1987, Lorenzo Antonio performed a duet of the song, "El Idioma Del Amor," also known in English as "We've Got Tonight," with Italian singer Fiordaliso.

In 1988, Lorenzo Antonio collaborated with Joan Sebastian, Lisa Lopez, Los Joao, and Byanka, on the song, "El Amigo Es," written by Enzo Malepasso, and Joan Sebastian.

In 2014, Lorenzo Antonio performed a duet with Ana Bárbara of the song "Caray", which was filmed live and released as a video.

In 2016, Lorenzo Antonio performed a duet with Yolanda del Río of the song "Se Me Olvidó Otra Vez" as a tribute to their friend, Juan Gabriel, just days after his death. This performance was filmed live and released as a video and as an audio single.

Charity work
Lorenzo Antonio and his sisters, Sparx, established a non-profit foundation in 2001. Known as "The Sparx and Lorenzo Antonio Foundation", its primary purpose is to provide scholarships to students, and to encourage higher education. Every year since its inception, Lorenzo Antonio and Sparx have held at least one concert where funds are raised for "The Sparx and Lorenzo Scholarship." This scholarship is also awarded yearly. Since 2001, Lorenzo Antonio and Sparx have awarded approximately $1,000,000 in scholarships to students.

Cultural impact

Mexico
In Mexico, there was an explosion of child entertainers that began in the early 1980s with acts like the Spanish group, Parchís, Lucerito, Luis Miguel, Timbiriche, Pedrito Fernandez, and Menudo. This cultural phenomenon of child entertainers was boosted even further with the broadcast of the "1er Festival Juguemos A Cantar," on "Siempre En Domingo". Due to the fact that Lorenzo Antonio Y Su Grupo won 1st place, they were at the forefront of the explosion of young talent at that time.

Immediately after Lorenzo Antonio Y Su Grupo were announced the winners of the 1er Festival Juguemos A Cantar, an immediate controversy ensued: Another finalist, Juanito Farias, who was also very popular and also a favorite to win the contest, came in last place. This was a major surprise to everyone and before the show ended, Raul Velasco, named Juanito Farias, "El Mejor Interprete Del Festival" (The Best Interpreter of the Festival). All of this stirred up much controversy and almost everyone had an opinion on the matter. Many felt that Juanito was robbed of 1st place, while many others felt that Lorenzo Antonio Y Su Grupo won 1st place fair and square. That argument continues to this day, and it can be seen in various forums and comments on YouTube and other places on the Internet.

United States
The financial help that Lorenzo Antonio has provided, along with his sisters, Sparx, via their foundation to New Mexico students, has had a substantial impact on the lives of many young adults. Many of the recipients of the Sparx & Lorenzo Antonio Scholarship have stated that they would have never been able to afford a higher education had it not been for the scholarship they were awarded.

Personal life

Family
Lorenzo Antonio's career has always been tightly intertwined with his family. His sisters, Sparx, and he perform regularly together, as well as collaborate with each other on their recordings, and in their musical business ventures.

Antonio also descends from a very musical family tree. On his paternal side, Antonio's father, Amador Sánchez, known artistically as Tiny Morrie, was a very successful singer, and continues to be a very successful songwriter and producer. Antonio also has two paternal uncles, Baby Gaby and Al Hurricane, who are musicians. Antonio's paternal grandparents also had a great love for music, and both of them played instruments and sang. Many of Antonio's paternal granduncles also were musicians.

On Antonio's maternal side, his mother, Maria De Lourdes Gloria Pohl, known artistically as Gloria Pohl, had success in the southwestern part of the United States as a singer. Antonio also has 12 maternal uncles and most of them were or are musicians of some sort, as well as his maternal grandfather.

Relationships
Until recently, not much was known about Lorenzo Antonio's romantic life. There were rumors that he dated several artists, such as Lolita Cortez and Lucero in the 1980s, but none of these rumors were ever substantiated.

Antonio married in 2004, but divorced less than a year later. There were no children from that marriage.

In 2010, Antonio appeared on a television show called Duetos, which was televised by Estrella TV. There, he met singer, Graciela Beltran. They had a much-publicized romance, and they appeared on several Latin television shows together, such as Ventaneando, and Escandalo tv. But for unknown reasons, their relationship ended abruptly after only 6 months in 2011.

Fitness
In 2005, Lorenzo Antonio started suffering from sciatica pain caused by a bulging disc in his lower back. The pain was so severe and debilitating that he even considered back surgery. In 2007, he began working with a personal trainer. At the advice of his trainer, Antonio changed his diet and exercise habits, and within 1 year, Antonio was almost 100% back to normal.

Antonio's physique had changed considerably due to his healthy lifestyle, and he capitalized on this by releasing a 2009 calendar showcasing his new physique.

Awards

Songwriting
1982: Platinum Record for the song, "Vamos A Jugar."
1983: Platinum Record for the song, "Lagrimas De Juventud."
1983: Platinum Record for the song, "Muchachita."
1983: Platinum Record for the song "Busco Un Amor."
BMI Award Winning Song for "Mandame Flores."
BMI Award Winning Song for "No Quieren Que Te Quiera."
BMI Award Winning Song for "Que Debo Hacer."
BMI Award Winning Song for "Te Amo Te Amo Te Amo."
BMI Award Winning Song for "Te Quiero Mucho."
BMI Award Winning Song for "El De Los Ojos Negros."

Record sales
1982: Platinum Record for the album "1er Festival Juguemos A Cantar."
1982: Platinum Record for the song, "Vamos A Jugar."
1983: Platinum Record for the song, "Lagrimas De Juventud."
1983: Platinum Record for the song, "Muchachita."
1983: Platinum Record for the song "Busco Un Amor."
1987: Platinum Record for the album "Doce Rosas."
1994: Gold Record for the album "Mi Tributo A Juan Gabriel."
1997: Triple Platinum Record for the album "Cantan Corridos."
1999: Platinum Record for the album "Cantan Corridos Vol. 2."

Other awards
1982: 15 Grandes De Siempre En Domingo, for the song, "Como Me Gustas."
1984: 15 Grandes De Siempre En Domingo, for the song, "¡Ay! Amor."
1984: Premio Amprofon De Oro
1987: 15 Grandes De Siempre En Domingo, for the song, "Doce Rosas."
1988: Premio AMPRyT – Mejor Interprete Juvenil 1988
1987: Aplauso 92 – Cantante Juvenil Revelación Del Año 1987

Discography

Official albums
1982: Lorenzo Antonio (Vamos A Jugar) – (Discos Musart)
1983: Lorenzo Antonio (Busco Un Amor) – (Discos Musart)
1984: Lorenzo Antonio (¡Ay! Amor) – (Discos Musart)
1985: Lorenzo Antonio (Inexperta Y Sensual) – (Discos Musart)
1986: Lorenzo Antonio (Por Orgullo) – (Discos Musart)
1987: Lorenzo Antonio (Doce Rosas) – (Discos Musart)
1988: El Amigo Es – (Discos Musart)
1989: Lorenzo Antonio (Amores Mios) – (Discos Musart)
1990: Estas En Mis Dominios – (Discos Musart)
1992: Mi Tributo A Juan Gabriel – (Warner Music Group)
1995: Tributo 2 – (Warner Music Group)
1996: Sparx Y Lorenzo Antonio Cantan Corridos – (Fonovisa)
1997: El No Te Quiere – (Fonovisa)
1998: Lorenzo Antonio (Siempre Te Amare) – (Fonovisa)
1998: Sparx Y Lorenzo Antonio Corridos Vol. 2 – (Fonovisa)
1999: Pura Miel (1st Edition) – (Fonovisa)
2001: Sparx Y Lorenzo Antonio Para Las Madrecitas – (Fonovisa)
2003: Lorenzo Antonio Y Sparx Grandes Exitos Con Mariachi – (Striking Music)
2003: Lorenzo Antonio Y Sparx ¡A Bailar! – (Striking Music)
2005: Canta Rancheras Y Mas... – (Striking Music)
2006: Rancheras Vol. 2 – (Striking Music)
2007: Lorenzo Antonio Y Sparx Corridos Famosos – (Striking Music)
2007: Lorenzo Antonio Y Sparx ¡Fiesta! – (Striking Music)
2008: Ranch3ras – (Striking Music)
2008: Amores – (Striking Music)
2010: Pura Miel (2nd Edition) – (Striking Music)
2011: Quedate Conmigo – (Striking Music)
2013: ¡En Vivo! – (Striking Music)
2014: Sparx Y Lorenzo Antonio Corridos Famosos Vol. 2 – (Striking Music)
2015: Exitos Rancheros – (Striking Music)
2016: Con Mariachi – (Striking Music)
2017: Ayer Y Hoy – (Striking Music)

Other albums (compilations and greatest hits)
1982: 1er Festival Juguemos A Cantar
A Escondidas
Amores Mios
Buscando Un Amor
Calendario De Amor
Coleccion De Oro
Dile
Hablemos De Amor
Mis Exitos En Ingles
No Es Nada Facil

References

External links

1969 births
American male singers
American male composers
21st-century American composers
American Latin pop singers
American mariachi musicians
American ranchera singers
Fonovisa Records artists
Musart Records artists
Warner Music Group artists
Living people
New Mexico music artists
Musicians from Albuquerque, New Mexico
Spanish-language singers of the United States
Latin music songwriters
21st-century American male musicians